Alessandro De Marchi may refer to:

 Alessandro De Marchi (conductor) (born 1962), Italian conductor
 Alessandro De Marchi (cyclist) (born 1986), Italian professional road and track bicycle racer